One for One may refer to: 
 One for One (Andrew Hill album), 1975
 One for One (Julian Austin album), 2009
 One for one, a social entrepreneurship business model